Valea Vinului is a commune of 2,334 inhabitants situated in Satu Mare County, Romania. It is composed of four villages: Măriuș (Mogyorós), Roșiori (Szamosveresmart), Sâi (Szinfalu) and Valea Vinului.

The Măriuș Monastery is located in Măriuș village.

References

Communes in Satu Mare County